Mikhail Vdovin (born 15 January 1967) is a retired Russian 400 metres runner.

Achievements

External links

1967 births
Living people
Russian male sprinters
Athletes (track and field) at the 1996 Summer Olympics
Olympic athletes of Russia
European Athletics Championships medalists
Goodwill Games medalists in athletics
World Athletics Indoor Championships medalists
Competitors at the 1994 Goodwill Games